Émile Rol (17 April 1920 – 1 September 2008) was a French racing cyclist. He rode in the 1950 Tour de France. He also won the 1949 Volta a Catalunya.

Major results
1943
 2nd Critérium National de la Route (free zone)
1946
 5th Overall Monaco–Paris
1948
 9th Overall Critérium du Dauphiné Libéré
1949
 1st  Overall Volta a Catalunya
1st Stage 2
 1st GP Monaco
1950
 1st Stage 5 Tour d'Algérie

References

External links
 

1920 births
2008 deaths
French male cyclists
Sportspeople from Alpes-Maritimes
Cyclists from Provence-Alpes-Côte d'Azur